Acacia chrysocephala is a shrub belonging to the genus Acacia and the subgenus Phyllodineae.

Description
It blooms from May to October and produces yellow flowers. The inequilateral phyllodes have an obtriangular to shallowly obtriangular shape with a margin congruent with branchlet. The simple inflorescences usually occur with one per axil forming globular flower heads with two to four flowers per head.

Taxonomy
The species was first formally described by the botanist Bruce Maslin in 1978 as part of the work Studies in the genus Acacia (Mimosaceae) - A revision of the Uninerves - Triangulares, in part (the tetramerous species) as published in the journal Nuytsia. Synonyms for this species include Racosperma chrysocephalum and Acacia biflora var. aurea.

A.  is a member of the Acacia biflora group and is  related to Acacia incrassata.

Distribution
It is native to an area in the Great Southern, Wheatbelt and the Goldfields-Esperance regions  of Western Australia where it grows in sandy or clay soils over laterite.
The distribution is scattered from around York extending south to around the Stirling Range and east as far as Scaddan. It is found in Eucalyptus wandoo woodlands, Eucalyptus marginata forests, in mallee scrub and sometimes in low heath communities.

See also
List of Acacia species

References

chrysocephala
Acacias of Western Australia
Plants described in 1978
Taxa named by Bruce Maslin